Tumidagena minuta is a species of delphacid planthopper in the family Delphacidae. It is found in North America.

References

Further reading

External links

 

Delphacini